Savdav is a village in the Kankavli taluka of Sindhudurg district in Maharashtra State, India.

Attractions 
There is a waterfall at Savdav that, being safe for swimming, is crowded with tourists, especially during the rainy season.

References 

Villages in Sindhudurg district